Denys Molchanov and Igor Zelenay were the defending champions but chose not to defend their title.

Marco Bortolotti and Cristian Rodríguez won the title after defeating Gijs Brouwer and Jelle Sels 6–2, 6–4 in the final.

Seeds

Draw

References

External links
 Main draw

Open Città della Disfida - Doubles
2021 Doubles